J. E. Franklin (born August 10, 1937) is an American playwright, best known for her play Black Girl, which was broadcast on public television in 1969, staged Off-Broadway in 1971, and made into a feature film in 1972. She has written and adapted eleven plays for television, theater, and film.

Biography
She was born Jennie Elizabeth Franklin in Houston, Texas, to Robert Franklin and Mathie Randle.  She was the eleventh of thirteen children. Her father operated the family's store and her mother worked as a maid in the homes of wealthy white families. Due to the alternating work and sleep schedules of her parents, there were strict rules about not making noise at home. She nearly drowned in a gully at the age of three. For a time there were six children in one bed, as the family rented out their house and lived in the store. Later, she worked alongside her mother, making beds, ironing, and peeling potatoes. "I was a domestic worker," she recalled. While doing domestic work she witnessed disrespectful words hurled at white women from their own family members.

After she learned how to write at school, she collected pencils and tablets of paper to write on, and her mother brought her cast-off fairy-tale books to read from the houses she worked in. She later said that Cinderella was an influence on Black Girl.

She attended the University of Texas at Austin, graduating in 1964 with a B.A. in Languages. She moved to New York, and lived in an apartment above Judson's Poet's theatre. She developed a passion for theater after witnessing Barbara Ann Teer and James Anderson perform live on stage in Rosalyn Drexler's Obie Award-winning one-act musical Home Movies in 1964. It was the first time she had seen Black actors live on a professional stage. She worked as Youth Director for the Neighborhood House in Buffalo, New York.

However, Franklin felt that her "roots were dying" and decided to return to the South. She taught the children of share-croppers at one of the Mississippi Freedom Democratic Party's Freedom Schools in Harmony, Mississippi, and at nearby Carthage. She taught the children how to read by getting them to speak and write down their words and matching the words to what they said. She helped to build the Sharon Waite Community Center in Harmony. This community center functioned as a haven for poor Black residents to gather and discuss their concerns and celebrate the spirit of their community. While in Mississippi she wrote her first play, A First Step to Freedom (1964). It was performed by the children at the community center. For many in the audience, it was the first play they had seen.

With the closing of the Freedom Schools, Franklin returned to New York. On the advice of her agent, Jim Bohan, Franklin sent her work out to theaters using just her initials, J.E., and not her name, Jennie Elizabeth, because "They didn't want women. If you talk to white women and Asian women who are playwrights, they'll tell you the same thing. They didn't want them either. So there was a gender thing." She made the "e" for Elizabeth a lower-case "e", and wrote her name "J.e. Franklin" "Because if I put a big "E" then they'd figure, "Okay, this is a man." If I put the little "e," there's, "Hmm, I wonder?" Good. Keep wondering. I like that. Let 'em wonder."

Her second play was the children's rock opera The In-Crowd: Rock Opera in One Act. It was produced by Woodie King Jr. who was the Cultural Arts Director for the Mobilization of Youth from 1965 to 1970. MOY was a social service agency designed to provide instruction, job training, counseling, and mental health services for delinquent youth on the Lower East Side. King collaborated on the music and dance. It played at the International Youth Festival in Montreal in 1967, which Franklin attended.

In 1966 she wrote Two Flowers, which was produced by the New Feminist Theatre. In 1966 she also wrote the Mau Mau Room. From 1967 to 1968 she worked at the U.S. Office of Economic Opportunity in Washington, D.C. While in Washington she volunteered in the soup kitchens of the Black Panther Party. Franklin first heard the term "institutional white racism" from the Kerner Commission in 1968. She moved back to New York and joined the Harlem Writers Guild, which had been founded by John Oliver Killens, Rosa Guy, John Henrik Clarke, Willard Moore, and Walter Christmas as a response to the exclusion they had experienced from the white literary world of New York. She joined so that she could "learn how to talk like a writer [and] get help [with her] work." There she interacted with Maya Angelou, Alice Childress, and Rosa Guy.

It was through her participation in the Harlem Writers Guild she had success with her play, Black Girl (play). She wrote the play following the publication of The Negro Family: The Case For National Action, commonly known as the Moynihan Report, in 1965, which linked Black poverty to Black matriarchy. As she said later: "The family is not, in my view, of the Moynihanesque matriarchy, but more like the Ashanti matrilineal family wherein males are not inferior in status, but rather society consents to a relationship of heritage around its females." As she later told the story, in the winter of 1968 "I was a member of the [Harlem Writers] Guild and I was at a Guild meeting when a representative from the (public television station) WGBH, (Boston), came to the Guild looking for black writers to write something for the series that they were in the process of putting together [On Being Black]. It was right after Dr. King's assassination that door kind of cracked open. White America was wondering, "What's wrong with the Blacks? What did we do to them? Haven't we been good to them?" So this white man came to the Guild and said that they were looking for people to write something for the series and quite a few of us turned in treatments. Mine was the only one that was selected. My treatment turned out to be Black Girl. Based upon maybe three pages of dialogue and a little narration of what I said I was going to do. They bought it and they hired me to write it for WGBH. It was a video production. So that very first production and presentation of Black Girl was a video production that was broadcast on NET (National Educational Television)" in 1969. George Houston Bass was the associate producer and script editor of this series (On Being Black) of original plays produced on WGBH-TV in 1968 and 1969 that aired nationally over the Public Broadcasting System. He helped to edit Black Girl for television. Franklin succeeded in getting her youngest sister, Yvette Franklin, to play the main role of Billie Jean, rather than a light-skinned actress. Nevertheless, Franklin disagreed with the producers' and the director's style and interpretation of her script, and was displeased with the actors' interpretations of the characters of Netta and Earl in particular.
 
In 1969 Mau Mau Room was directed by Shauneille Perry as part of Douglas Turner Ward and Robert Hooks's Negro Ensemble Company Workshop Festival  at St. Mark's Playhouse. According to Franklin, the cast included Richard Roundtree. The name "mau-mau" comes from the name of a secret society of Kikuyu insurgents who led a rebellion against British colonial rule in Kenya, and means "death to the whites". Franklin later changed the title of the play at the behest of her agent (it was eventually called Miss Honey's Young'uns).

Woodie King Jr. founded the New Federal Theatre in 1969, adding "New" to the idea of the Federal Theatre Project. The first play that he produced was Black Girl. According to Franklin, King's wife, Willie Mae King, had seen Black Girl on WGBH-TV. When King was sent the script of the play by Franklin's agent, his wife read the script and picked Black Girl. Franklin requested that it be directed by Shauneille Perry, who had directed Mau Mau Room. It played first at St. Augustine's Church (Manhattan) on Henry Street. The play received standing ovations and played to full houses, and the critics gave it rave reviews. The production was then moved to the Off-Broadway Theatre de Lys, where it played for a record six-month run of 247 performances. A few months after the play opened Off-Broadway, another producer offered a road contract to tour four major cities: Baltimore, Washington, D.C., Chicago, and Detroit. A new, second cast had to be hired, which led to Franklin casting Bill Cobbs and discovering the actress Peggy Pettitt, who played Billie Jean in the touring play and later in the film adaptation. Franklin received a Drama Desk Award for most promising playwright for the play, as well a Media Woman Award. Dramatist Play Services published Black Girl: A play in Two Acts in 1971. Franklin was invited to speak at public events, including Barbara Ann Teer's Sunday Symposium Series at the National Black Theatre.

In 1971 she worked on a feature-film adaptation of the play, Black Girl (1972 film), directed by Ossie Davis, for a very small advance. The experience of making and marketing the film was an unhappy one for Franklin. Although the producer, Lee Savin, promised that Woodie King Jr. would be involved in the project, King was dropped. She urged Davis to hire Shauneille Perry as an assistant, but he did not. While she managed to get them to hire Peggy Pettitt, rather than "a light-bright-damned-near-white actress", to play Billie Jean, against her wishes they cast Claudia McNeil, who had been in A Raisin in the Sun (1961 film), as Mu'Dear. Scenes were re-written and re-arranged by the director, and her voiceover to cover up a "ridiculous" scene between Mu'Dear and Mr. Herbert was never recorded. Even more egregiously, "Efforts were made early in the filming to exploit material for sex and violence," she said. Franklin tried to have a scene where the young female character of Billie Jean disrobes in front of the camera removed; it stayed in the film, albeit without nudity. The poster for the film "showed a blow-up of Norma Faye's face, teeth snarling in mad-dog fashion, threatening Billie Jean with a knife. A moment which had lasted only five seconds had been lifted from the film to represent the supposed essence of the entire play.... This was blatant misrepresentation." After Franklin threatened to register her disapproval at every newspaper or television interview and speaking engagement, "In the next few days the illustration appeared without the knife. I thought that was the end of the matter; but a week later later the knife was back." Finally, "voice-overs had been used to erase all "fucks" to make the film eligible for a PG rating. ... I was urged not to mention to anyone that these cuts had been made, as people might think that they had missed something." The film was released in 1972. It had its world premiere at the Strand Theatre (Manhattan), then known as the Penthouse Theater on Broadway, to benefit sickle cell anemia. The film received mixed reviews, with the mainstream New York Times critic describing it as "a poor movie that makes it look as if there never had been a good play."

In 1969, Franklin was hired as a part-time Lecturer in the Department of Education at Lehman College in the Bronx. The following year, she was hired as a full-time Lecturer. She taught at Lehman College until 1975. During this time she wrote several lays for her Lehman students, including Four Women: A Play in One Act (1973), based on the Nina Simone song Four Women, reimagined as roommates attending an integrated college, which was performed at Lehman College, and The Creation (1975).

In 1972, she published the short-story "The Enemy" in Black Short Story Anthology edited by Woodie King Jr., along with stories by James Baldwin, Nikki Giovanni, Ralph Ellison, Alice Walker, Langston Hughes, and King himself. The story was later adapted for the stage in 1973.

In 1971 she wrote The Prodigal Daughter for a street theatre project performed on Bronx street corners and at Lincoln Center. She later wrote the book for The Prodigal Sister, a musical, with music by Micki Grant, and lyrics by both. It was directed by Shauneille Perry. It played first at the New Federal Theatre's Henry Street Playhouse in July 1974, and then at Theatre de Lys in November 1974, where it was warmly reviewed by Clive Barnes.

In 1974 she received the Dramatic Arts Award from the Howard University Institute for the Arts and Humanities. In 1976 was awarded funding from the National Endowment for the Arts to work on the South Carolina Arts Commission and used theater to teach literacy to children in grades K-12. She wrote Another Morning Rising for a theater troupe, The Company of Us, to tour throughout South Carolina. In 1978 she received the Better Boys Foundation Playwriting Award and the Ajabei Children's Theater Annual Award. In 1979 she received a National Endowment for the Arts Creative Writing Fellowship. In 1980 she received a Rockefeller Fellowship.

In 1977 she published Black Girl: From Genesis to Revelation.

In 1978-1979 she taught at Skidmore College. From 1982 to 1989 she was the resident playwright at Brown University. In 1990 she was a Visiting Assistant Professor in the Department of Theatre Arts at the University of Iowa. In the 1990s she was a faculty member at the Harlem School of the Arts.

In 1979 she wrote Christchild, which is set in Houston during the Depression, and had a reading of the play at the Church of the Crucifixion. She revised it over the years, and in 1992 it was produced by the New Federal Theatre. It received the John F. Kennedy Center's New American Play Award.

Other plays by Franklin include Freedom Rider, MacPilate (1974), Another Morning Rising (1976) The Hand-Me-Downs, Cut Out the Lights and Call the Law, Two Mens'es Daughter, and Midd N'Victas.

Personal

Franklin married Lawrence Siegel. Her daughter is the actress Malika Nzinga.

Selected credits

Theatre

Television

Film

Publications

Personal

Franklin married Lawrence Siegel. Her daughter is the actress Malika Nzinga.

Awards
 Drama Desk Award (1971–72)

References

1937 births
Living people
Drama Desk Award winners
Writers from Houston
American women dramatists and playwrights
20th-century American dramatists and playwrights
20th-century African-American writers
21st-century African-American people
20th-century African-American women writers
20th-century American women writers
21st-century African-American women